Jai Kalra is an Indian actor who has appeared in Bollywood films and Indian television dramas. He is popularly known for playing the role of Vikram Shergill in Bade Achhe Lagte Hain.

Career 
Jai entered Bollywood playing a role in the movie Page 3 by ace Director Madhur Bhandarkar The Movie won a National Award.
Jai also played a role in the movie Shagird (2011 film) directed by Tigmanshu Dhulia and Rajshri Productions 2011 film Love U...Mr.Kalakaar!

Jai started his Television career with Ekta Kapoor'''s Kis Desh Mein Hai Meraa Dil on STAR Plus, a show aired between 2008-09 for which he won the Best Actor in the Negative Role.

Later Jai appeared in Sony TV's Show Bhaskar Bharti which started in May 2009 and ended in December 2009. He is most popular for Balaji Telefilms show Bade Achhe Lagte Hain  which started in May 2011 and ended in July 2014. Jai's performance in the show won him appreciation globally. He received many nomination and adulation for the portrayal of Vikram Shergill in the show.

Jai was last seen as a Lead Protagonist  in Life OK's Laut Aao Trisha'' in lead role with actress Bhagyashree Patwardhan.

Television shows

References

External links
 

Indian male television actors
Living people
Year of birth missing (living people)